Arrojadocharis is a genus of flowering plants in the family Asteraceae.

 Species
Both species are endemic to the State of Bahia in Brazil
 Arrojadocharis praxeloides (Mattf.) Mattf. 
 Arrojadocharis santosii R.M.King & H.Rob.

References

Eupatorieae
Endemic flora of Brazil
Asteraceae genera